Hypolepis may refer to:

 Hypolepis (plant), a genus of fern in the family Dennstaedtiaceae
 Psaliodes (syn. Hypolepis), a genus of moth in the family Geometridae